The Irrawaddy squirrel (Callosciurus pygerythrus) or hoary-bellied Himalayan squirrel  is a species of rodent in the family Sciuridae.

Description 

Irrawaddy squirrels vary in fur color, some squirrels being greyish-brown and reddish-brown, with some squirrels being grizzled. Some squirrels have dark tips of their tails, and pale hip patches. Its head to body length is about 20 centimeters, and its tail length is about 20 centimeters as well. Irrawaddy squirrels weigh approximately 45 grams.

Distribution 
It is native to Bangladesh, China, India, Myanmar, and Nepal. Most squirrels that live in Myanmar live west of the Irrawaddy River. Irrawaddy squirrels can live in a number of types of forests, including deciduous broad-leaved woodland, coniferous evergreen forests, mixed agricultural areas, and secondary growth forests. They can live in lowlands and lower mountainous regions, at around 1500 meters. It is threatened by habitat loss.

Diet 
Irrawaddy squirrels mainly eat nuts, seeds, fruits, bark, lichen, and various types of vegetation, however some squirrels may eat insects and small vertebrates.

Gallery

References

Callosciurus
Mammals of India
Mammals of Bangladesh
Mammals described in 1832
Taxonomy articles created by Polbot